The Control of Major Accident Hazards Regulations 2015 (COMAH) are the enforcing regulations within the United Kingdom of the Seveso III Directive devised in Brussels following the Seveso disaster. They are applicable to any establishment storing or otherwise handling large quantities of industrial chemicals of a hazardous nature. Types of establishments include chemical warehousing, chemical production facilities and some distributors.

Details
The principal aim of the regulations is to reduce the risks of potential major accidents, such as the Flixborough disaster, that are associated with the handling of hazardous substances. The regulations operate on two levels depending on the establishment's status which is divided into two categories,'Lower Tier' and 'Upper Tier', determined by inventory.

Lower tier establishments are required to document a Major Accident Prevention Policy which should be signed off by the managing director. A top tier COMAH establishment is required to produce a full safety report which demonstrates that all necessary measures have been taken to minimise risks posed by the site with regard to the environment and local populations. The penalty for unauthorised storage can be severe and companies unsure of whether the COMAH regulations apply should seek advice from trade associations and local health and safety inspectors.

The Competent Authorities and enforcing agencies in the UK are the Health and Safety Executive and either the Environment Agency in England, Natural Resources Wales (NRW) in Wales or the Scottish Environment Protection Agency (SEPA) in Scotland.

References

External links 
Health and Safety Executive
COMAH guidance for businesses on NetRegs.gov.uk
COMAH regulations on Legislation.gov.uk
Environment Agency
Scottish Environment Protection Agency
Safety Report Assessment Manual
Chemical Warehousing Trade Associations
WorkSafe Victoria - Major Hazards
Emergency Management Portal - online resources for UK emergency managers

1999 in British law
Chemical industry in the United Kingdom
Health and safety in the United Kingdom
Regulation of chemicals in the United Kingdom
Statutory Instruments of the United Kingdom